William Charles Cochran (August 25, 1934 – January 3, 2019) was a Democratic member of the Indiana House of Representatives, he represented the 72nd District from 1982 to 2008 and the 68th District from 1974 to 1982.

Cochran was born in New Albany, Indiana. He went to Indiana University Southeast. Cochran was involved with the real estate business. Cochran served as the Floyd County Clerk from 1967 to 1974.

References

External links
Indiana State Legislature - Representative Bill Cochran Official government website
Project Vote Smart - Representative William C. 'Bill' Cochran (IN) profile
Follow the Money - William C Cochran
2008 2006 2004 2002 2000 1998 1996 1994 campaign contributions

County clerks in Indiana
Democratic Party members of the Indiana House of Representatives
1934 births
2019 deaths
People from New Albany, Indiana
Indiana University Southeast alumni
Businesspeople from Indiana
21st-century American politicians
20th-century American businesspeople
American real estate businesspeople
20th-century American politicians